Coppetts Wood Hospital was a hospital in Muswell Hill, London. It was managed by the Royal Free London NHS Foundation Trust.

History
The hospital had its origins in an isolation hospital for residents in the Hornsey area which was built at Coppetts Wood between 1887 and 1888. It was extended in 1894 and expanded to take patients from the Finchley and Wood Green areas from 1922. It joined the National Health Service in 1948.

In the late 1960s the infectious diseases department of the Royal Free Hospital transferred to the hospital at Coppetts Wood. However, in the late 1990s, all services transferred back to the Royal Free Hospital and Coppetts Wood Hospital closed in 2000.

References

Defunct hospitals in London